Biathlon at the 2012 Winter Youth Olympics took place at the temporary Biathlon Course at the Seefeld Arena venue in Innsbruck, Austria. One of the mixed events is contested together with cross-country skiers.

Medal table

Events

Boys' events

Girls' events

Mixed events

Multi-medalists
Athlets who have won at least two medals.

Qualification system

References

 
2012 in biathlon
2012 Winter Youth Olympics events
2012
Youth Olympics